George M. Rose was Speaker of the North Carolina House of Representatives. He was a Democrat.

He grew up in Fayetteville, North Carolina. He studied at Donaldson Academy, Davidson College, and the Virginia Military Institute. He won a house seat at the end of the Reconstruction era in 1876. In 1881 he represented Cumberland County, North Carolina in the House. He served with several African Americans.

References

19th-century American politicians

Speakers of the North Carolina House of Representatives

Year of birth missing
Year of death missing